The 1975 Pacific Cup was the first edition of the Pacific Cup, a rugby league tournament held between Pacific teams. The tournament was hosted by Papua New Guinea and eventually won by the New Zealand Māori side, who defeated the hosts 38-13 in the final.

Background
The 1975 Pacific Cup was initiated by the New South Wales Rugby League. The tournament involved two Australian state sides as well as Papua New Guinea, who did not yet have Test match status, and the New Zealand Māori.

The Northern Territory were invited to participate, but had to drop out after Darwin was devastated by Cyclone Tracy.

Squads
Coached by Tom Newton, the New Zealand Māori squad included Paul Matete, John Wilson, Fred Ah Kuoi, John Smith, Rick Muru, Dane Sorensen, Dennis Key, Ian Bell and captain Richard Bolton. The Māori side played a warm up game before the competition began, defeating Group 19 12-11 in Tweed Heads.

Results

Round 1

Round 2

Round 3

Final

References

Pacific Cup
International rugby league competitions hosted by Papua New Guinea
1975 in Papua New Guinean sport
Pacific Cup
1975 in Oceanian sport